Krapp is a surname. Notable people with the surname include:

 Edgar Krapp (born 1947), German organist
 Gene Krapp (1887–1923), American baseball player
 George Philip Krapp (1872–1934), American academic
 Herbert J. Krapp (1887–1973), American theatre architect and designer

See also
 Krapp's Last Tape, a play by Samuel Beckett
 Krapp, ou, La dernière bande, a chamber opera by Marcel Mihalovici adapted from Krapp's Last Tape
 Crap (disambiguation)